Mailpile is a free and open-source email client with the main focus of privacy and usability. It is a webmail client, albeit one run from the user's computer, as a downloaded program launched as a local website.

Features 
In the default setup of the program, the user is given a public and a private PGP key, for the purpose of (respectively) receiving encrypted email and then decrypting it. Mailpile uses PGP and stores all locally generated files in encrypted form on-disk. The client takes an opportunistic approach to finding other users to encrypt to, those that support it, and integrates this in the process of sending email. 

The program preloads a lot of email data into RAM to accelerate search results. While the search results remain really fast despite large amounts of emails, this gradually slows down the start-up time of the program as stored email data increases. This feature will likely be altered in the planned Mailpile version 2.

History 

Mailpile started out as a search engine in 2011.

Crowdfunding 

The project gained recognition following an Indiegogo crowdfunding campaign, raising $163,192 between August and September 2013. In the middle of the campaign, PayPal froze a large portion of the raised funds, and subsequently released them after Mailpile took the issue to the public on blogs and social media platforms including Twitter.

Releases

Alpha 
The first publicly tagged release 0.1.0 from January 2014 included an original typeface (also by the name of "Mailpile"), UI feedback of encryption and signatures, custom search engine, integrated spam-filtering support, and localization to around 30 languages.

Alpha II 
July 2014 This release introduced storing logs encrypted, partial native IMAP support, and the spam filtering engine gained more ways to auto-classify e-mail. The graphical interface was revamped. A wizard was introduced to help users with account setup.

Beta 
Mailpile released a beta version in September 2014.

Beta II 
January 2015
1024 bit keys were no longer being generated, in favour of stronger, 4096 bit PGP keys.

Beta III 
July 2015

Release Candidate 

A preliminary version of the 1.0 version was released on 13 August at the Dutch SHA2017 Hacker Camp, where the main developer gave a talk about the project.

Notes

References

External links 

Email clients
Free software programmed in Python
Software using the GNU AGPL license
Software using the Apache license
MacOS email clients
Email client software for Linux
Windows email clients
Free software webmail
Tor onion services